Equal Ground is a non-profit organization based in Colombo, Sri Lanka, that advocates for political and social rights for lesbian, gay, bisexual, transgender (LGBT), intersex and queer people. The organization, established in 2004, claims to be the first organization in Sri Lanka that welcomes people of all sexual orientations and gender identities... The organization was founded by Sri Lankan gay rights activist Rosanna Flamer-Caldera and offers trilingual publications and services. It aims to achieve its goals through political activism, education, personal support, building awareness and through organized community events. It has been working more closely with lesbian, bisexual and transgender women in areas of human rights, law reform, sexual health, and violence based on sexual orientation and gender identity. The organization continues to face many challenges working in Sri Lanka where homosexuality is stigmatized and considered criminal offense that can earn up to ten years of prison under the law. Efforts of the LGBT activists to undo the British colonial law criminalizing sodomy was not repealed, but the law was expanded to include women and the penalty was worsened. Queer groups in Sri Lanka have frequently stated that some of their members have been subjected to harassment—by blackmail or by threats with exposition or arrest—by police and other people, using the legal provision.

Notable works 
 Equal Ground provided disaster relief to its community and others when the 2004 tsunami hit Sri Lanka leaving many deaths and homelessness.
 Colombo Pride is the only annual Pride celebration in Sri Lanka, and is organized by Equal Ground since 2005. The first ever event was attended by around 350 people. The newspaper Ceylon Today describes it as a week-long joyous celebration with a variety of events full of color, music and diversity.
 Equal Ground launched its first publication "Human, Right?" in 2005 to celebrate the International Day against Homophobia (IDAHOT). The publication located LGBTQ rights within the larger framework of human rights and appealed for the importance of LGBTQ rights as a part of human rights.
 Rainbow News, which is published quarterly by Equal Ground is the Sri Lanka's only LGBT publication.
 The annual South Asian Lesbian and Bisexual Women's Conference and Training was supported by Equal Ground in the years of 2010 and 2011.
 The organization launched its "I Might be Transgender: a booklet for transgender youth" at the 2014 IDAHOT conference that took place in Colombo, Sri Lanka.  It also released the documentary "The Invisible Stain" at the same occasion.
 Equal Ground working in collaboration with the Kaleidoscope Australia Human Rights Foundation, a group that promotes equal rights for LGBT people in Asia Pacific region, submitted an alternative human rights report on "Sri Lanka's protection of the rights of LGBTI Persons" to the United Nations Human Rights Committee in September 2014.

Achievements and recognition 
Following Equal Ground and Kaleidoscope Australia's 2014 shadow report on LGBT rights in Sri Lanka that was submitted to the United Nations Humans Rights Committee, the government representatives from Sri Lanka admitted to the committee for the first time that the human rights of LGBT people were protected under the country's anti-discrimination laws. LGBT rights activists and the community widely welcomed this as a small change in the positive direction.
In 2012 Women Deliver identified Equal Ground as one of the fifty most influential groups around the world that provides services to women. Women deliver appreciated and congratulated Equal Ground for its work towards leadership and empowerment of women.

See also 

LGBT history in Sri Lanka

References 

Human rights organisations based in Sri Lanka
LGBT political advocacy groups in Sri Lanka
2004 establishments in Sri Lanka
LGBT rights in Sri Lanka
Organizations established in 2004